Joseph Constant Eugène "Joop" Haex (24 November 1911 – 14 April 2002) was a Dutch politician of the defunct Christian Historical Union (CHU) now merged into the Christian Democratic Appeal (CDA), an army officer and lieutenant general of the Royal Netherlands Army he served during World War II and the post-war years.

Decorations

References

External links

Official
  J.C.E. (Joop) Haex Parlement & Politiek

1911 births
2002 deaths
Christian Historical Union politicians
Commanders of the Order of Orange-Nassau
Democratic Socialists '70 politicians
Dutch corporate directors
Dutch nonprofit directors
Dutch people of World War II
Dutch prisoners of war in World War II
Graduates of the Koninklijke Militaire Academie
Knights of the Order of the Netherlands Lion
Royal Netherlands Army generals
Royal Netherlands Army officers
Royal Netherlands Army personnel of World War II
Politicians from Maastricht
People from Wassenaar
State Secretaries for Defence of the Netherlands
World War II prisoners of war held by Germany
20th-century Dutch military personnel
20th-century Dutch politicians